All My Heroes Are Cornballs is the third studio album by American rapper JPEGMafia, released on September 13, 2019 by EQT Recordings. After the release of his record Veteran (2018), he began recording tracks for its follow-up, with a total of around 93 songs by 2019. He handled the production, mixing and mastering in his home studio. The album features guest appearances from Abdu Ali, Helena Deland and Buzzy Lee, as well as additional vocals by Refined Sugar, Vegyn and Young Emoji. Vegyn also serves as a co-producer on one track.

An avant-garde, experimental hip hop, and punk rap album, All My Heroes Are Cornballs draws influences from experimental pop, glitch hop, ambient, noise and industrial music. It has a smoother and more melodic sound than its predecessor, employing uncommon song structures, extensive sampling, and a variety of vocal techniques such as rapping, screaming and singing, often in falsetto. Thematically, the album is personal, introspective, and presented in a stream of consciousness form, touching on the Internet culture, prejudice, political issues and JPEGMafia's newfound fame.

All My Heroes Are Cornballs was promoted as a "disappointment" with videos released on the rapper's YouTube, along with two singles: "Jesus Forgive Me, I Am a Thot" and "Beta Male Strategies". It was supported by the JPEGMafia Type Tour, which began in North America on October 14, 2019 and ended in Europe on July 6, 2020. Upon release, All My Heroes Are Cornballs received widespread acclaim from critics, with many highlighting the humorous, sarcastic lyrical content, as well as praising its detailed and chaotic production; some of them deemed it superior to Veteran, and it was placed in numerous publications' year-end lists. The album debuted at number 105 on the Billboard 200, becoming JPEGMafia's first entry in the chart.

Background and recording
Following the release of his second and breakthrough studio album Veteran in 2018, JPEGMafia started working on his next album. He had recorded 93 or 94 songs, some of which were "compiled" into a record. "Beta Male Strategies" and "Grimy Waifu" were the first songs to be recorded. The tracks were produced, mixed and mastered by himself in his home studio, which was also the case for Veteran. The mixing and mastering took place around the end of Vince Staples' 2019 Smile, You're On Camera tour in support of FM!, for which he was an opening act. He constantly uploaded the progress percentage to his Instagram, with it being at 35% in March 2019, and at 52% in May 2019.

Music and lyrics

All My Heroes Are Cornballs is an avant-garde experimental hip hop and punk rap record. It contains sound collages, influences from ambient music, glitch hop, noise, industrial and experimental pop, and elements of trap, R&B and vaporwave. Thomas Hobbs of BBC News opines that JPEGMafia draws "heavily from the DIY ethos of punk rock to create music to be moshed to" and that the album could "easily be categorised as punk rock as hip-hop".

The album is loosely structured, marked by constant tonal and vocal shifts, erratic and "random" use of samples and noises, and unconventional song structures, which are also present in his previous album Veteran. Most critics have perceived the album as melodic and less abrasive than Veteran, with JPEGMafia's high tenor vocals ranging "from a goofy falsetto to a strained scream rap". JPEGMafia called it his "punk musical" and referred to it as vulnerable, introspective and his most personal album to date; he has cited the Beach Boys' Smile, TLC's FanMail, Björk, Cam'ron, Everything but the Girl, Kanye West and Rick Rubin as influences.

Thematically, many music journalists have noted the album's approximation with the Internet culture. They described the lyrics as stream of consciousness, humorous, ironic, and aggressive, catering "to the self-aware and overtly ironic mindset of this age". The album also expresses progressive political content and "scathing" social commentary. JPEGMafia's "persona is built on opposition"; he raps against prejudice, racism, "posers", his "haters", police brutality, political extremism, right-wing politics, groupthink critics and online shitposters. The lyrics also reflect on his recent fame and have numerous pop culture references, including wrestling, anime and video games. Evan Welsh of Spectrum Culture summarizes them as "outwardly political and dissatisfied while also being ironic, cynical and funny." Some songs are performed from the perspective of a woman, using gendered terms like "thot", "slut", and "girl".

Songs

Tracks 1–9
The album's opener, "Jesus Forgive Me, I Am a Thot", starts with noise of shattering glass and screaming people, and transitions into a "sickly soulful" guitar. It is built around a broken piano riff and ethereal distorted vocal samples, with heavy R&B influence. JPEGMafia's mellow rap gives place to screaming halfway through its first verse. Using Auto-Tune, he sing-raps the "melodic lines" for the chorus: "I can't feel my face, oh God!/SMH, no ASMR". The next track, "Kenan vs. Kel", which title references 1990s sitcom Kenan & Kel, starts off "calm and reflective" over a keyboard riff and a dusty beat, and finds JPEGMafia "seductively crooning and showing real uncertainty about his newfound fame". The song shifts to a punk rock-inspired instrumental midway through, using a percussive power chord with "gnarly" guitars and forceful drums, over which JPEGMafia screams his lines. The third song, "Beta Male Strategies", is a pop rap-oriented noise rap song with "manipulated vocal sample, hand claps, rave-ready drums, and a smidge of guitar" which confronts and pokes fun at the alt-right and internet trolls. The instrumental "JPEGMafia Type Beat" is an Atari Teenage Riot homage, which critics interpreted as ridiculing "type beats" in contemporary hip hop production and his comparisons to Blackie and, more frequently, Death Grips.

"Grimy Waifu" is a mellow guitar-backed downtempo ode to a gun disguised as a love song, inspired by his time spent in the military; it is followed by "PTSD", an anxious song backed by murky synths and breakbeats "channeling his military past". "Rap Grow Old & Die x No Child Left Behind" references Bobby Brown and Michael Jackson to mock whitewashing in the music industry, where he also sings about "the unfair cycle of society". The title track is a glitchy song with elements of pop rap, which features JPEGMafia singing and reflecting on the themes of the album. The outro contains a recording of his friend ordering a bacon smokehouse meal from Wendy's, which he described as "really random" and was almost cut from the record. The next track, "BBW", meaning "Black Brian Wilson", is a "brief, simple" classic hip hop-style track about JPEGMafia's mortality and place in the industry.

Tracks 10–18
The tenth track, "Prone!", has "ugly", "demented" synths and a precise, aggressive vocal performance from JPEGMafia threatening "to kick his enemies to the floor"; particularly, on "One shot turn Steve Bannon into Steve Hawking", Pitchfork noted resistance to white nationalism. Its spacey ambient-like outro has a cover of Wayne Wonder's "No Letting Go". JPEGMafia has stated the song was made "completely digitally", with the intention of making "a punk song with no instruments". The interlude "Lifes Hard, Here's a Song about Sorrel" references the hibiscus tea (called "sorrel" in Jamaica), considered a homage to his Jamaican heritage.

"Thot Tactics" is melodic and features a "sticky" hook. "Free the Frail", which was considered to be cut from the album, contains guest vocals from Helena Deland, with bright synths, mellow piano and "such a cool chord change", as Deland exclaims later in the song. On the chorus, JPEGMafia sings "Don't rely on the strength of my image", serving as a mantra. Critics highlighted the song's vulnerability and "honest account of anxiety". "Post Verified Lifestyle" is structured in three sections. It has an ambient beat with ad-libs and clipped vocals, with the last part being composed of looping vocal samples. In the song, JPEGMafia delivers a braggadocio with "a hint of claustrophobia", comparing himself to MF Doom, Beanie Sigel, the Beatles and 98 Degrees. "BasicBitchTearGas" is a short, dissonant skit-like pop song with "glitchy backing, stuttering acoustic guitar and manipulated vocals", covering "No Scrubs", by TLC. "DOTS Freestyle Remix" is a remix of JPEGMafia's performance in an episode of The Cave, a YouTube series by Kenny Beats in which he and his guests create a track on-camera. The boastful track features guest vocals from Buzzy Lee and Abdu Ali, a prominent sound of fire (from campfires which he had recorded in Hawaii), a "cutesy" synth tune and a vaporwave outro. "Buttermilk Jesus Type Beat" is an instrumental built with "lucid piano and spacious drum programming". The album closes with "Papi I Missed U", a "thesis statement" addressing racism, gun violence in the United States, as well as JPEGMafia's fame and criticism of his work.

Release and promotion

Prior to the album's release, JPEGMafia constantly labeled his new project as a "disappointment". He promoted his album through a series of videos uploaded to his YouTube channel, featuring listening sessions, discussions, and mocked negative reactions from artists James Blake, Kenny Beats, Buzzy Lee, DJ Dahi, Channel Tres, and Jeff Tweedy. Post-release, JPEGMafia added two reaction videos to his "disappointed" playlist on YouTube; one featuring Denzel Curry, alternately titled "Satisfied", and another with Slowthai and Kwes Darko.

On August 13, 2019, JPEGMafia released the first album single, "Jesus Forgive Me, I Am a Thot". On August 28, he officially announced that his third album would be titled All My Heroes Are Cornballs, to be released on September 13. On September 10, he released the second single, "Beta Male Strategies". Two days later, a listening party for the album launch took place in Baltimore, Maryland.

The artwork was designed by Alec Marchant, JPEGMafia's photographer and close friend. The album was supported by the JPEGMafia Type Tour through Canada and the United States, from October 14 to November 11, 2019. The second part of the tour took place in Europe from February 20 to July 6, 2020. On November 11, 2019, JPEGMafia released a music video for the song "Free the Frail".

On February 29, 2020, JPEGMafia announced a "Mystery USB" in the style of PlayStation 2 Memory Cards limited to 100 copies for sale on his website. After shipping being delayed due to COVID-19 concerns, the USB was revealed to be a deluxe edition of the album featuring bonus tracks and original mixes of songs that were left off the initial release. The USB also contained episodes of his "Disappointed" series that were never uploaded to YouTube with Flume and Injury Reserve.

Critical reception

All My Heroes Are Cornballs was met with widespread acclaim from music critics, who described it as "chaotic, inventive, and terrific." Some considered the album to be an improvement over Veteran. On review aggregator Metacritic, which assigns a normalized rating out of 100 from mainstream publications, the album received an average score of 85, based on 14 reviews, indicating "universal acclaim". Aggregator AnyDecentMusic? gave All My Heroes Are Cornballs 8.1 out of 10, based on their assessment of the critical consensus.

In a review for Pitchfork, Stephen Kearse characterized JPEGMafia as "bubbly and inventive", a provocateur, an "impish writer" and an "athletic vocalist". Nick Roseblade of Clash opined that the album's lyrics "[feel] very stream of consciousness full of political commentary, the concerns of living in American 2019, whilst being engaging, humorous, and informative", and that the key to the album is its "juxtaposition of sounds, and textures". For The Line of Best Fit, Sam Higgins wrote that the album is "so questionable, unique and conflicted in its elements, that on first glance, it's uninviting and dissonant", but with an "undeniable quality" upon more concentrated listens.

Tony Inglis of The Skinny was somewhat critical of the lyrical content, but complimented JPEGMafia's "ability to tap into the zeitgeist" and his skills as a producer. Alexander Robertson (robertsona) of Sputnikmusic thought that the album is a "monumental display of musical talent" and has the "signs of a true classic", commending its "daring attitude and commitment to odd sonic luxuries". Thomas Hobbs of NME characterized the record as his most accomplished, unexpected, and "meticulously sequenced", "where anger frequently gives way to tranquillity". HipHopDXs Josh Svetz presented the album as "challenging and uncompromising" and "a manifesto for the misunderstood", complimenting JPEGMafia's "insane production and brilliant engineering".

Eli Schoop of Tiny Mix Tapes said that All My Heroes Are Cornballs is one of the best produced albums of the year, and likened the album to an electronic manifesto and an auditory guerrilla warfare. He compared it to James Ferraro's Far Side Virtual, reasoning that both are inspired by "internet anxiety", as JPEGMafia's "memetic technology and kinetic mindset" resembles Ferraro's "dread of automation and late-stage capitalism web osteria". This was echoed by Kieran Press-Reynolds's review for Highsnobiety, which says that JPEGMafia "nails the chaos of post-internet society", and that his writing is reminiscent to Virginia Woolf, "who felt overwhelmed by modernity and tried to describe it in the best way they could". It also described the album as a "better hodgepodge of empowered tumult" than his previous record Veteran. For Q, Kate Solomon gave it a less enthusiastic review, saying that "JPEGMAFIA's flashes of brilliance are obscured by a bloated tracklist, but they're worth digging out".

Accolades

Track listing

Notes
 "JPEGMafia Type Beat", "Prone!", "DOTS Freestyle Remix" and "Buttermilk Jesus Type Beat" are stylized in all caps.
 On the Bandcamp and vinyl releases, "Papi I Missed U" is listed as "🥺".
 On the vinyl release, "Grimy Waifu" is listed as "Grimey Waifu", "BasicBitchTearGas" is listed as "BabyBeamerBoy", and "DOTS Freestyle Remix" is listed as "DOTS Freestyle Remix x Make Me Cry".
 On the Bandcamp release and the limited USB edition, an updated version of "Jesus Forgive Me, I Am a Thot" contains an extended outro, changing its length to 3:03.
 On the limited USB edition, "BasicBitchTearGas" has been extended, changing its length to 2:40.

Sample credits

 Several tracks, including "Jesus Forgive Me, I Am a Thot", contain an uncredited sample of "You Think You Know Me (Edge)", by Jim Johnston.
 "Prone!" contains an uncredited interpolation of "No Letting Go", by Wayne Wonder.
  "BasicBitchTearGas" contains an interpolation of "No Scrubs", by TLC.

Personnel
Credits adapted from Bandcamp and JPEGMafia's website.
 JPEGMafia – vocals, production, mixing, mastering , engineering, all instruments , keyboards , bass , drums , guitar , drum programming 
 Buzzy Lee – flute , featured vocals 
 Vegyn – co-production, guitar, piano, additional vocals , vinyl design
 Young Emoji – additional vocals 
 Refined Sugar – additional vocals 
 Helena Deland – featured vocals 
 Abdu Ali – featured vocals 
 Alec Marchant – artwork design, photography

 Isha Dipika Walia – vinyl design
 George Edge – assistant vinyl design

Charts

Notes

References

Primary sources
In the text these references are preceded by a double dagger (‡):

2019 albums
Albums recorded in a home studio
JPEGMafia albums
Mass media about Internet culture
Punk rap albums
Punk rock albums by American artists
Albums produced by Vegyn
Albums produced by JPEGMafia